Deer Valley is an alpine ski resort in the Wasatch Range, located  east of Salt Lake City, in Park City, Utah, United States.  The resort, known for its upscale amenities, is consistently ranked among the top ski resorts in North America.

Deer Valley was a venue site during 2002 Winter Olympics, hosting the freestyle moguls, aerial, and alpine slalom events.  It also regularly hosts competitions for the International Ski Federation.

Resort profile

With a number of other large ski resorts nearby, Deer Valley competes by catering to a more upscale audience than its neighbors, offering amenities such as free ski valets, free parking shuttles, fine dining and boutique shopping in the main lodge. Deer Valley appeals to the ski community due to it being one of three resorts in the nation that is ski only.   Stein Eriksen, namesake of the Stein Eriksen Lodge, was host of the mid-mountain lodging property and director of skiing at the resort until his death in 2015.

Deer Valley uses more grooming equipment than other Wasatch ski areas, and limits access to avoid overcrowding; the resort limits ticket sales to 7,500 per day. Deer Valley's total uphill lift capacity of 50,470 skiers per hour is approximately 50% higher than the capacity of each of its larger neighbors Park City Mountain Resort and the former Canyons Resort (now merged with PCMR). Deer Valley has 21 chairlifts, including 12 high speed detachable quads and an enclosed 4-passenger gondola.

History

Mountain development

Skiing began at Deer Valley with the Park City Winter Carnivals of the 1930s, and the Works Progress Administration (WPA) built the first ski trails and other facilities during the winter of 1936–1937. The first ski lifts appeared in 1946, when local residents Robert Emmett Burns, Sr. and Otto Carpenter constructed them, largely from nearby lodgepole pines. The ski area was called the Snow Park Ski Area, a name which endured from 1946 to 1969. In 1981 Edgar Stern founded Deer Valley Resort in the same area and above. The resort totals  in size.

Expansion and improvements
Deer Valley opened in 1981 on Bald Eagle and Bald Mountains, with one double chairlift and four triple chairlifts built by Lift Engineering, also known as Yan: the Burns double (which was the only remaining original lift on the mountain up until being removed in the summer of 2022) servicing learning terrain in the Snow Park base area, the Carpenter triple for lapping terrain on Bald Eagle Mountain, the Homestake triple for access from Bald Mountain and Silver Lake base area back to the summit of Bald Eagle Mountain, and the Sultan and Wasatch triples for lapping terrain on Bald Mountain. Yan would construct two more infill triple chairlifts in the years immediately afterwards, adding Sterling in 1982 to provide a direct link from Silver Lake to the summit of Bald Mountain, and Clipper in 1983 as an up-and-over lift linking Snow Park with Silver Lake. In 1984, the Mayflower triple was built, creating an additional pod of expert terrain on Bald Mountain to the east of Sultan. 

In 1991, Deer Valley's first high speed quad was built by Yan to replace the Carpenter triple on Bald Eagle Mountain. That same year, the resort expanded onto Flagstaff Mountain with Yan building two triple chairlifts: Red Cloud for lapping the new intermediate and advanced trails, and Viking to provide egress from the area. The Crown Point triple was also built to create a direct route back to Snow Park from Bald Mountain. 

In 1993, Deer Valley added its second high speed quad and first from Garaventa CTEC with the opening of the Northside Express, running to the summit of Flagstaff Mountain and servicing a new pod of intermediate terrain. The Snowflake beginner double was also built to supplement Burns at the Snow Park base. All new Deer Valley lifts built from 1993 on have been built by Salt Lake City-based Doppelmayr CTEC and its predecessors.

In 1996, Garaventa CTEC also replaced the Yan-built Carpenter Express with an all-new high speed quad due to safety concerns brought on by a grip failure on a similar-model lift at Whistler-Blackcomb, a process which involved giving the lift new terminals, chairs, and grips, but retaining the original lift's Yan towers. The Wasatch triple was replaced with a high speed quad in that same year, while being reinstalled the following year on Flagstaff Mountain as the Quincy lift, creating a direct link from the base area to the summit.

For the 1998–99 season, Deer Valley underwent a major expansion, adding two more mountains. The first expansion was onto Little Baldy Peak, located northeast of Snow Park. Little Baldy Peak was serviced by a fixed grip quad, Deer Crest, servicing a mix of beginner, intermediate, and expert terrain. This expansion also included a gondola, the Jordanelle Express Gondola, providing access to the resort from a new base area directly off US Highway 40. Concurrently, the resort also expanded west from Flagstaff Mountain into Empire Canyon, bringing the resort's boundary up against the boundary to Park City Mountain Resort. A high speed quad, the Empire Express, was built to service new intermediate and expert terrain,  while a fixed grip quad known as Ruby was built to provide egress back to Flagstaff Mountain.

Deer Valley built many new lifts on its existing terrain in the early 2000s. In 1999, the Homestake triple was replaced by a fixed grip quad, and the old triple was moved to Empire Canyon the following year to become Little Chief, creating a small learning area that would be eliminated in 2009 with the lift's removal. In 2000, the Silver Lake Express replaced the Clipper triple to create a direct link between the Snow Park base lodge and the Silver Lake lodge at mid-mountain. Three new high speed quads were built on Flagstaff Mountain from 2001 to 2004, with Quincy being upgraded in 2001, Ruby in 2002, and an infill lift, Silver Strike, being constructed in 2004 to provide access from new real estate developments in between Northside and Quincy. The Quincy triple would go on to be reinstalled at The Canyons as Day Break, while the Ruby lift was relocated to Brighton Ski Resort and used to replace that resort's Majestic lift. Also in 2004, an additional triple chairlift, Judge, was built to supplement Viking in moving guests from Flagstaff Mountain to the Silver Lake base. 

Following the upgrades on Flagstaff Mountain, the resort moved to upgrading the lifts on Bald Mountain, with the new lifts being supplied by Doppelmayr CTEC. Sultan was replaced with a high speed quad in 2005, with the lift being extended downhill so that a catwalk could be built, making it directly accessible from the Silver Lake lodge without having to ride Sterling or Wasatch. Sterling was replaced with a high speed quad the following year in 2006. 

In 2007, the resort expanded onto Lady Morgan Peak, to the north of Flagstaff Mountain, with a new 200 acre pod composed of nine trails and additional gladed terrain serviced by its own high speed quad.

In 2012, detachable chairlift service was added to Little Baldy Peak with the replacement of Deer Crest with a Doppelmayr high speed quad, known as the Mountaineer Express. Deer Crest was relocated to Crystal Mountain Resort in Washington, where it opened in 2014 to replace a Riblet double chairlift.

On October 3, 2014, Deer Valley Resort announced that it had entered into an agreement to buy Solitude Mountain Resort and took over operations on May 1, 2015.

In August 2017, Deer Valley was sold to the newly formed multi-resort entity, Alterra Mountain Company, a joint corporation composed of KSL Capital Partners and Intrawest Resort Holdings, LLC.

In 2018, the Homestake fixed grip quad, providing access from Silver Lake to the summit of Bald Eagle Mountain, was replaced with a high speed quad constructed by Doppelmayr.

Evolution of guest services
Deer Valley was one of the first resorts to offer ski valets to carry guests' ski gear, free parking-lot shuttles, and a state-licensed child-care facility, and to uniform all its employees. It also provides tissues in the lift lines, refers to customers as "guests", and provides complimentary overnight ski check services.

International competitions

2002 Olympic Winter Games
During the 2002 games Deer Valley hosted the freestyle moguls and aerials, and alpine men's and women's slalom events. Three of the resort's runs were used during the games including Champion (site of freestyle moguls), Know You Don't (site of alpine slalom), and White Owl (site of freestyle aerials). Temporary spectator stadiums were located at the end of each run, they were 12 stories tall and included seating for 10,000 people, while spectator standing areas were located along the sides of each course; the standing areas and stadium combined allowed roughly 13,300 spectators to view each event. 99.4 percent of available tickets for events at the venue were sold, which totaled 96,980 spectators witnessing competitions at the resort. During the games 95 percent of Deer Valley remained open to the public for normal seasonal operations.

World Cup events
The resort hosted the 2003 and the 2011 FIS Freestyle World Ski Championships, becoming the first American venue to host twice. It also hosted the men's and women's moguls and aerials events for FIS Freestyle Ski and Snowboarding World Championships 2019.

Deer Valley is a regular host to FIS World Cup events, having hosted men's and women's mogul and aerial competitions yearly since 2000 (with the exceptions of 2003 and 2004). The resort also hosted a skicross event in 2008, and is scheduled to host a World Cup event every year through 2019.  Deer Valley's track record of event hosting has led it to be described as "a Mecca for freestyle skiing events".

Awards
Deer Valley was ranked first overall in SKI magazine's 2017 reader resort survey.  Since 1998, the resort has always been ranked in the top three and was ranked first for five consecutive years between 2007 and 2011. In the history of the survey no other resort has been ranked first for more than three consecutive years. In the 2017 survey, the resort received first place ratings in the categories of grooming, service, lodging, and kid friendliness. In addition, Deer Valley has received top 10 ratings in the categories of snow, lifts, weather, apres-ski, off-hill activities, access, dining, on-mountain food, and overall satisfaction.

At the inaugural World Ski Awards, Deer Valley won the award for best ski resort in the United States for 2013. The resort continued to be ranked first for 2014, 2015, 2016, and 2017.

Deer Valley's Mariposa at Silver Lake has been rated the #1 restaurant in Utah by the Zagat Restaurant Guide.

Snowboard prohibition
Deer Valley is one of three remaining American ski resorts that prohibit snowboarders along with Alta and Mad River Glen. The resort has occasionally been the subject of protests and poaching by snowboarders such as when snowboard manufacturer Burton Snowboards offered $5,000 for video footage of riders snowboarding at Alta, Deer Valley or Mad River Glen in late 2007.  According to Burton's website, the point of their campaign was that such discrimination displays a "blatant aggressive disregard" for the Constitution of the United States.

Climate and terrain
This climatic region is typified by large seasonal temperature differences, with warm to hot (and often humid) summers and cold (sometimes severely cold) winters.  According to the Köppen Climate Classification system, Deer Valley has a humid continental climate, abbreviated "Dfb" on climate maps.

Terrain Aspects: North 45%, South 2%, East 45%, West 8%.

References

External links

 Deer Valley – Official website
 Deer Valley – A brief history
 Park City Guide – Resort info, lodging options, and real estate

Alterra Mountain Company
Venues of the 2002 Winter Olympics
Olympic alpine skiing venues
Olympic freestyle skiing venues
Ski areas and resorts in Utah
Utah culture
Sports venues completed in 1981
Sports venues in Summit County, Utah
Works Progress Administration in Utah
Wasatch Range
1981 establishments in Utah